Eagle Junction is a former suburb of Brisbane, Queensland, Australia. It is now a neighbourhood within the suburb of Clayfield.

History
The neighbourhood takes its name from the Eagle Junction railway station. The station was originally named Eagle Farm Junction, but the name was changed to just Eagle Junction in January 1888. The original name reflects that this station was the junction at which the railway line to Eagle Farm railway station split off.

Education

Schools
Eagle Junction State School is a primary school which is located in Eagle Junction.

Transport

Train
Eagle Junction railway station provides regular Queensland Rail City network services to Brisbane CBD, Brisbane Airport, Shorncliffe, Doomben and Caboolture.

Bus
Inbound
Route 320 – Chermside, Wavell Heights, Eagle Junction, Bowen Hills, City

Outbound
Route 320 – City, Bowen Hills, Eagle Junction, Wavell Heights, Chermside

East
Route 303 – Toombul, Ascot, Eagle Farm, Pinkenba

Route 369 – Mitchelton, Stafford City, Kedron Brook, Aviation High, DFO

West
Route 303 – Pinkenba, Eagle Farm, Ascot,  Toombul
Route 369 – DFO, Aviation High, Kedron Brook, Stafford City, Mitchelton

Road 
Eagle Junction is connected by State Route 20, which runs from Wooloowin to Hendra.

References

External links 
 [ Eagle Junction station – TransLink]

Brisbane localities
Clayfield, Queensland